Bruce Bernard Ibbetson (born January 13, 1953 in Hollywood, Los Angeles) is a former American competitive rower and Olympic silver medalist.

Education
Bruce is a 1975 graduate of the University of California, Irvine.

Olympics
Ibbetson qualified for the 1980 U.S. Olympic team but was not able to compete due to the U.S. Olympic Committee's boycott of the 1980 Summer Olympics in Moscow, Russia. He was one of 461 athletes to receive a Congressional Gold Medal many years later. He was a member of the American men's eights team that won the silver medal at the 1984 Summer Olympics in Los Angeles, California.

References

1953 births
Living people
Rowers at the 1984 Summer Olympics
Olympic silver medalists for the United States in rowing
American male rowers
Medalists at the 1984 Summer Olympics
Congressional Gold Medal recipients
Pan American Games medalists in rowing
Pan American Games gold medalists for the United States
Medalists at the 1979 Pan American Games
Rowers at the 1979 Pan American Games